According to the Book of Mormon, Alma, the son of Alma was a Nephite prophet often referred to as Alma the Younger to distinguish him from his father, who is often referred to as Alma the Elder. These appellations, "the Younger" and "the Elder," are not used in the Book of Mormon; they are distinctions made by scholars, useful because both individuals were prominent during the same time period in the Book of Mormon's story and filled a similar cultural and religious role. Alma is the namesake of the Book of Alma.

Summary of his life
Alma the Younger lived in Zarahemla during the end of the reign of the Nephite King Mosiah. Adherents of Mormonism believe that he was born in 126 BC.  As a young man, he, the four sons of Mosiah, and others wanted to destroy the church and actively persecuted its members. After they were visited personally by an angel and rebuked for their actions, Alma fell into an unconscious state where for three days and three nights he lay unable to move until he felt within that he had been forgiven of his sins. He later recounted that he had experienced a vision during unconsciousness, in which he renounced his behavior against the church and subsequently received a glimpse of God sitting on his throne. He and those who persecuted church members with him abdicated their role as persecutors and became followers of Christ.

Alma the Younger subsequently became the first elected chief judge of the Nephites as well as their religious leader. He observed that the Nephites of the church were becoming increasingly wicked, proud, disdainful of outsiders and neglectful toward the poor and needy. When the "unbelievers" began to follow their example, Alma feared the entire people were on the path to self-destruction (Alma 4:11). He resigned his post as chief judge and began traveling from city to city to preach to the Nephites. He began in Zarahemla, where his efforts were successful. A thorough purge of the church leadership and membership took place, with those former insiders and leaders who refused to relinquish their pride being "rejected, and their names blotted out".

Alma moved on to the cities of Gideon and Melek, where his call to humility was also well received.  From Melek he traveled three days journey north to Ammonihah, whose inhabitants proved much more hardened than those of the previous three cities.

In Ammonihah the people were very wicked. They considered themselves superior to outsiders, especially the Lamanites, and gloried in the strength of their city, which they considered indestructible. According to Alma chapter 9, Satan held such control over them that they would not listen to Alma.  While trying to speak to them he was abused and thrown out of the city. Commanded by an angel to return, Alma slipped back into the city through a different route from the south. There he met Amulek, a lapsed believer (Alma 10:5-6) of some social prominence who fed Alma and housed him for a time.  In the city streets, the two of them joined up and preached to the people, where they were challenged by a lawyer named Zeezrom.  After Amulek had silenced Zeezrom through his teaching and aroused his conscience, Alma took his turn, preaching to the people with similar results. When finished, Alma and Amulek were cast into prison and delivered by a miracle. A repentant Zeezrom eventually joined Alma in his missionary work.

Several years later, Alma met up with a man named Korihor, whom the Book of Mormon describes as an anti-Christ. This Korihor tried to lead the Nephites astray. Alma confronted him, confounding his arguments and miraculously removing Korihor's power of speech. The stricken Korihor signaled acknowledgement that he had acted maliciously, knowing all along that he was wrong and bringing destruction upon others. He was reduced to begging and was eventually run down and killed in a city of Nephite dissenters called Zoramites.

These same Zoramites were found to practice things that perverted the ways of the Lord. This led Alma to extend his missionary work to these people. While among them, he was most successful with the poor.

Alma's final instruction was to his sons, Helaman, Shiblon, and Corianton.  He gave each separate lessons, and finally gave the records of the church to Helaman. He then departed, in the 19th year of the reign of the judges (or 73 BC) as if to go to Melek, but was never heard from again. Both Mormon and Helaman believed that he was taken up like Moses of old, and buried by the Lord.

Descendants
The Book of Mormon narrative describes several of Alma's notable descendants as shown in the following family tree:

Alleged similarities to Saul
Various critics argue that there are similarities in both plot and language between Alma the Younger's conversion story and the conversion story of Saul of Tarsus in the Bible. Critic Grant H. Palmer argues for nine specific parallels between Alma and Paul's conversion narrative plus various similarities in language. FAIR, the Latter-day Saint apologetics organization, argues that the parallels are superficial or otherwise poorly contrived. Latter-day Saint philosopher and historian Alan Goff, in a long paper written for and published in Interpreter: A Journal of Latter-day Saint Faith and Scholarship, argues that the "New and Old Testaments appropriate an ancient narrative genre called the prophetic commissioning story. Paul’s and Alma’s commissioning narratives hearken back to this literary genre, and to refer to either as pilfered is to misunderstand not just these individual narratives but the larger approach Hebraic writers used in composing biblical and Book of Mormon narrative."

References

Further reading

 
 J. Christopher Conkling, "Alma's Enemies: The Case of the Lamanites, Amlicites, and Mysterious Amalekites" Journal of Book of Mormon Studies 14/1 (2005)
 

Book of Mormon prophets
Book of Mormon people
Angelic visionaries